The Strange Door is a 1951 American horror film, released by Universal Pictures, and starring Charles Laughton, Boris Karloff, Sally Forrest and Richard Stapley. Karloff's role is actually a supporting one but his name carried significant weight in the billing. The picture was directed by Joseph Pevney and was based on the short story "The Sire de Maletroit's Door" by Robert Louis Stevenson. Its alternative title was Robert Louis Stevenson's The Strange Door.

Plot
Sire Alain de Maletroit (Charles Laughton), plots revenge on his younger brother Edmond (Paul Cavanagh) for stealing Alain's childhood sweetheart, who died giving birth to Edmond's daughter Blanche (Sally Forrest). Alain secretly imprisons Edmond in his dungeon for 20 years and convinces Blanche that her father is dead.

Alain intends to further debase Blanche as revenge against Edmond. Alain tricks a high-born drunken cad, Denis de Beaulieu (Richard Stapley), into believing he has murdered a man. Denis escapes a mob by entering the Maletroit chateau by an exterior door which has no latch on the inside. Alain makes Denis a captive intending to force the delicate Blanche into marriage with him.

Alain goes to the dungeon to torture Edmond with the news Blanche will be married to Denis, an unworthy rogue. After Alain leaves, Edmond asks the family servant Voltan (Boris Karloff) to kill Denis before the wedding. However, Denis shows unanticipated redemptive qualities and he and Blanche fall in love. When Voltan comes to kill Denis, Blanche pleads with Voltan to spare his life and help him escape.

Their attempts to escape are foiled by Alain, who then seals Edmond, Blanche and Denis in a stone cell and starts a waterwheel that presses the cell walls inward to crush them to death. Voltan fights Alain and gets the key to the dungeon and pushes Alain into the waterwheel, temporarily stopping the crushing walls. Wounded by the guards, Voltan struggles to the dungeon and, with his dying breath, gets the key to Denis just as the walls start moving in again. Denis, Blanche and her father escape the cell. Denis and Blanche decide to stay together and Edmond has the strange door removed from the chateau.

Cast
 Charles Laughton as Alain de Maletroit
 Boris Karloff as Voltan
 Sally Forrest as Blanche de Maletroit
 Richard Stapley as Denis de Beaulieu 
 William Cottrell as Corbeau
 Alan Napier as Count Grassin
 Morgan Farley as Renville
 Paul Cavanagh as Edmond de Maletroit
 Michael Pate as Talon

Production

Development and casting
Film historian Tom Weaver described The Strange Door as Universal re-entering the horror film business, describing the film as a "combination chiller-costume melodrama". The film was initially announced as The Door which remained its title during production.  The film is based on "The Sire De Malétroits Door" by Robert Louis Stevenson which was a short story initially published in Temple Bar magazine in 1878.  Weaver described screenwriter Jerry Sackheim's adaptation of the story as including various Gothic archetypes into the story with peepholes in the walls, ghostly wailings in the night and a torture chamber leading the film to be "a well-disguised remake of Universal's The Raven (1935)."

The film's director was Joseph Pevney, a former vaudeville performer who performed on Broadway and entered the film industry in 1946 in Nocturne. He made his directing debut in 1950 with his crime film Shakedown. Pevney later stated to Weaver that he did not know why he made The Strange Door, declaring that "I was a new director and I was assigned movies in those days and they told me, "This is what you're gonna do." I'd do three or four pictures a year, when I started. But as I stayed with the studio and people got to know me [...] I was able to turn things down."

Among the cast was Charles Laughton who began work on the film following his ten-performance Bible-reading tour. Laughton earned $25,000 for his role in the film. Sally Forrest who played Blanche de Maletroit stated she did not recall how she got the part, stating "I guess I went out on an interview and got it" and stated later that horror films were not her favourite, but she had not seen many films at that point as her family was very poor growing up. Forrest was out on loan from MGM for her part in the film. Richard Stapley who played Denis De Beaulieu had played some stage rolls in New York and made his film debut in The Strange Door.  Robert Douglas was the first actor considered for the role of Corbeau, after he had played many villainous roles in several Universal feature films.

Filming
The Strange Door was scheduled to be made in 18 days and began production on May 15, 1951. Production ended on June 5.

Release
The Strange Door had a sneak preview at Los Angeles's United Artists Theatre following a screening of the Joel McCrea Western film Cattle Drive. Comment cards from the audience had 19 of them rating the film as "Outstanding", 24 as "Excellent", 26 as "Very Good", 17 as "Good", 5 as "Fair" and 2 as poor.  Among the comments made by the patrons, comments included on the violence on the film ("Excellent acting-interest plot without being too gruesome", "Maybe a little too much on the gory side") the actors ("Keep track of Richard Stapley", "Did not like Richard Stapley", "Sally Forrest stinks"), and the overall quality of the film ("Best picture I have seen in many months", "Kept you on the edge of your seat", and "This is the first picture attended in year since bought teleivision. Pictures will have to be more exceptional before I come again."

The Strange Door was initially set up as a November 1951 release. The film had several early pre-release screenings including Shea's cirtuic theatres in Mississippi on October 31 and in Shea's Theatre in Jameston, New York. In the first week of November, Universal started to release The Strange Door around the United States, specifically in California, the Northwest, the Midwest and the East Coast. 75% of the screenings of the film were seen on Double bills.

The Strange Door, along with Night Key, Tower of London, The Climax and The Black Castle, was released on DVD in 2006 by Universal Studios as part of The Boris Karloff Collection. In 2019, Kino Lorber's Blu-ray release featured a fact-filled audio commentary by Tom Weaver, Dr. Robert J. Kiss and David Schecter.

References

Sources

External links

 
 
 

1951 films
1950s historical horror films
1951 horror films
American historical horror films
American black-and-white films
Films based on works by Robert Louis Stevenson
Universal Pictures films
Films set in France
Films directed by Joseph Pevney
1950s English-language films
1950s American films